Iryna Mykhailivna Dekha (born May 14, 1996 in Kharkiv) is a Ukrainian weightlifter. She is a two-time Olympian and 2016, 2021 and 2022 European champion.

Career 
Dekha started her trainings while studying at the Professional Sports College Kharkiv which graduates were, among others, Oleksiy Torokhtiy, Vanda Maslovska, Oleksandr Likhvald, Kamila Konotop, Viktoriya Shaimardanova. She was disqualified for two years at the very beginning of her professional career for doping violations, namely using stanozol.

Her international career after doping ban was resumed in 2015. She showed high performances in junior age, winning several medals, and managed to qualify for the national team. Her first senior championships was 2015 European Championships in Tbilisi, Georgia, where she finished 8th, but next year she would become European champion.

Dekha competed for Ukraine at the 2016 Summer Olympics. She lifted in total 247 kg and finished 5th.

2017 European Championships in Split, Norway, was not successful for Dekha since she failed to lift any weight in clear and jerk. Later that year, she became champion of the 2017 Summer Universiade where she won the competition in the −90 kg category.

In 2018, Dekha debuted at the World Championships and finished 6th in Ashgabat, Turkmenistan. In 2019, she was 5th.

Dekha was one of two Ukrainian weightlifters at the 2020 Summer Olympics in Tokyo, Japan. She went to Tokyo as reigning European champion after winning the title at the 2021 European Championships in Moscow, Russia. Though she finished 2nd in snatch at the Olympics, she failed to lift any weight in clear and jerk.

Dekha changed her weight category to 81 kg and won her third European title in 2022 in Tirana, Albania, where she lifted in total 253 kg and surpassed the silver medalist and her team fellow Alina Marushchak by 18 kg.

Major results

References

External links
 
 
 
 

1996 births
Living people
Ukrainian female weightlifters
Olympic weightlifters of Ukraine
Weightlifters at the 2016 Summer Olympics
Weightlifters at the 2020 Summer Olympics
Universiade gold medalists for Ukraine
Universiade medalists in weightlifting
Sportspeople from Kharkiv
Doping cases in weightlifting
Ukrainian sportspeople in doping cases
European Weightlifting Championships medalists
21st-century Ukrainian women